Babozai (often spelled: Babuzai) (Pashto: بابوزئ) is a town and union council of Mardan District in Khyber-Pakhtunkhwa. It is located at 34°50'0N 72°8'0E and has an altitude of 1754 metres (5757 feet).

Babozai is called Babozai because of Pashtun tribe Babuzai 

Khan's of babuzai are Son's of Noor dad khan 

Muslim dad khan , najam dad khan, mukamil khan, sharif dad khan, Ashraf dad khan, shafiq dad khan, and Touseef dad khan.

See also
 Katlang
 Mian Khan
 Sangao (Mardan District)
 Babuzai
 Mardan
 Mardan District

References

External links 
 Babozai Mardan Facebook Page
 Babozai Mardan View From Kandao

Union councils of Mardan District
Populated places in Mardan District